Pusey–Crozier Mill Historic District, also known as Pusey Plantation and Landingford, is a historic mill complex and national historic district located at Upland, Delaware County, Pennsylvania.  The district includes nine contributing buildings, one contributing site, and one contributing structure, at the site of the first grist mill and sawmill erected by the English Quakers in 1682.  They are the Pennock Log House (1790), schoolhouse (1849), four single houses (1850), large double house (1850s), mid-19th century barn, and the original mill site, headrace, and tail race. The Caleb Pusey House is located in the district and separately listed on the register.

It was added to the National Register of Historic Places in 1976.

References

Historic districts on the National Register of Historic Places in Pennsylvania
Historic districts in Delaware County, Pennsylvania
National Register of Historic Places in Delaware County, Pennsylvania